Toad Rage is a children's novel by Australian author Morris Gleitzman. It was first published in Australia in 1999 by Puffin Books.

Plot summary
Limpy, a young cane toad who narrowly escapes from becoming roadkill, enters the gates of the Olympic Games and finds a sweet girl who once again saves him  from being squashed. Limpy tries and fails to have cane toads become the Sydney Olympic mascots. Limpy finally finds a way to protect his family from the terror of the highway. Soon, Limpy's plan succeeds, and cane toads everywhere (or almost everywhere) are safe again.

Sequels
This book was followed by four other books: Toad Away, Toad Heaven, Toad Surprise, and Toad Delight.

Reception
Reviews for Toad Rage were positive, with Publishers Weekly describing the book as "saucy fun from start to finish". The School Library Journal review notes the adventurous story and the colourful use of Australian slang (with a glossary in the back) as being key to a "hugely funny read". A review of the audiobook by SLJ recommends it for boys and reluctant readers due to the "gross-out" humour. The Washington Post review gives some context of how cane toads in Australia are viewed and notes some practices might make readers squeamish but otherwise recommends the book. A reviewer for Kirkus Reviews described Toad Rage as "both solid entertainment and a barbed commentary on the importance of looks". A reviewer for Booklist recommends it for grades 3-6 and says it will give readers "plenty of laughs".

References

Further reading

Sheahan-Bright, Robyn (2000) "Irreverence for Sacred Cows" Australian Book Review, no. 218 February–March, 2000 p. 53-54.
Harrison,Peta (2000) "Untitled Review" Fiction Focus : New Titles for Teenagers, vol. 14 no. 2, 2000 p. 29
Zahnleiter,Joan (2000) "Untitled Review" Reading Time : The Journal of the Children's Book Council of Australia, vol. 44 no. 2 May 2000 p. 17
Read, Maggie (2001) "Untitled Review" Fiction Focus : New Titles for Teenagers, vol. 15 no. 3, 2001 p. 49-50

1999 novels
1999 children's books
Australian children's novels
Books about frogs
Novels by Morris Gleitzman